Rachel Hunter (born 8 September 1969) is a New Zealand model, actress and the host of Imagination Television's Rachel Hunter's Tour of Beauty. She has appeared on several magazine covers, including Vogue, Elle, Rolling Stone, Sports Illustrated, Playboy, Cosmopolitan and  Harper's Bazaar. She has been on the cover of the Sports Illustrated Swimsuit Issue twice; in 1994 (alongside Kathy Ireland and Elle Macpherson) and in 2006 (alongside six other models).

Early life
Hunter was born in Glenfield, a suburb of Auckland, New Zealand, and educated at Glenfield College. Her parents divorced when she was still a child. As a child she wanted to be a ballet dancer, but at 13 became ill with toxoplasmosis, which curtailed her dancing ambitions.

Career

Modelling 
Hunter began her career at age 16, modelling in France, Australia and New Zealand, appearing in Australian Vogue, Harper's Bazaar, Australian Cosmopolitan and for various campaigns throughout New Zealand and Australia. She became the face of Tip Top Ice-Cream in New Zealand and was the "Trumpet Girl". She was quickly signed up to Ford Models and immediately embarked on a successful career, landing a Cover Girl cosmetics contract and becoming the spokesperson for the company for quite a few years. Hunter rose to global prominence after posing as a Sports Illustrated swimsuit model in 1989. She subsequently appeared on magazine covers, including Cosmopolitan and on the 1994 "Dream Team" cover of Sports Illustrated's annual swimsuit issue with other Supermodels Elle MacPherson and Kathy Ireland, and again graced its cover, this time solo, 12 years later in 2006. Hunter also appeared on the cover of Vogue Italia, Australian Vogue, American and international editions of Elle and Dutch Harper's Bazaar.

Hunter posed nude for a cover-featured Playboy pictorial published in April 2004.

Hunter is signed to Ford Models in New York, Select Model Management in London, and Chadwick Models in Sydney.

Acting
Hunter first appeared on television in 1985 in an advertisement for a New Zealand Ice-Cream brand promoting their "Trumpet" ice-cream.

Hunter guest starred in a 1997 episode of The Drew Carey Show as herself. She has appeared in several independent films, including 1999's A Walk in the Park and 2000's Two Shades of Blue, an erotic thriller with Marlee Matlin. She stars as a lesbian cook doling out relationship advice in the award-winning indie film La Cucina. She had a brief appearance as a sexy mother in Dennis Dugan's The Benchwarmers (2006) and also played a sultry, bikini-clad mother in the music video for Fountains of Wayne's 2003 song "Stacy's Mom."

Hunter was one of six celebrities in the inaugural cast of the American dance competition series Dancing with the Stars in 2005. She appeared on a 2005 celebrity episode of Lingo, where she and her partner Trista Rehn split $US30,000 for charity. Hunter is an ambassador to The Born Free Foundation, and established the Rachel Hunter Lowland Gorilla Fund. Hunter also appeared as herself in the 2004 Christmas Special of The Vicar of Dibley. She also starred in Confessions of a Go-Go Girl (2008), The Perfect Assistant (2008), the science fiction TV movies Piranhaconda (2011) and Swamp Volcano, aka Miami Magma (2012).

She appeared as a judge on New Zealand's Got Talent from 2012 to 2013. In 2015, Hunter fronted her own television series titled "Rachel Hunter's Tour of Beauty" for TV One where she travelled the world to discover what beauty meant in various countries.

Personal life 

In the late 1980s Hunter lived with rock musician Kip Winger.  Winger stated after their relationship ended that he was left heartbroken when Hunter left him for Rod Stewart.

At the age of 21, Hunter met rock star Rod Stewart, 24 years her senior, in a Los Angeles nightclub. They married three months later at the Beverly Hills Presbyterian Church in Beverly Hills, California, on 15 December 1990. Together they have two children: Renée (b. 1992) and Liam (b. 1994). They separated in January 1999 after eight years of marriage, and their divorce was finalised on 2 November 2006.

She had a year-long relationship with Canadian NHL ice hockey player Sean Avery in 2004, and in 2006 began a three-year relationship with Jarret Stoll, 13 years her junior, also a Canadian NHL player who played for, and won the Stanley Cup with, the Los Angeles Kings. Her son Liam was a junior player being mentored by him while playing for the LA Kings Juniors when they first met. Stoll proposed to Hunter in 2008 whilst he accompanied her on a trip home to her native New Zealand later that year and they were due to marry on 14 August 2009, but the wedding was called off by Stoll seven weeks prior to their wedding day.

Filmography

Film

Television

Music videos

Dancing with the Stars

References

External links

 
 

1969 births
Living people
New Zealand female models
New Zealand emigrants to the United States
New Zealand film actresses
New Zealand television actresses
Participants in American reality television series
Family of Rod Stewart
People from Auckland
People educated at Glenfield College